Urazayevo (Urazay) is a rural locality (a village) in Podlubovsky Selsoviet, Karaidelsky District, Bashkortostan, Russia. The population was 275 as of 2010. There are 5 streets.

Geography 
Urazayevo is located 60 km southwest of Karaidel (the district's administrative centre) by road. Nagretdinovo is the nearest rural locality.

References 

Rural localities in Karaidelsky District